David Rasmussen (born 1 December 1976 in Copenhagen) is a Danish former professional footballer who is assistant coach for GVI in the Danish 2nd Division. He spent one season in the Bundesliga with Hansa Rostock.

References

1976 births
Living people
Danish men's footballers
Footballers from Copenhagen
Association football midfielders
Denmark international footballers
Bundesliga players
Boldklubben af 1893 players
PEC Zwolle players
FC Nordsjælland players
FC Hansa Rostock players
Viborg FF players
Karlslunde IF managers
Danish expatriate men's footballers
Danish expatriate sportspeople in the Netherlands
Expatriate footballers in the Netherlands
Danish expatriate sportspeople in Germany
Expatriate footballers in Germany